Come Morning is a studio album by American jazz musician Grover Washington Jr. The album was released in 1981 via Elektra label.

Reception
Michael Erlewine of AllMusic commented "Background singers, synthesizers. This is more programmed mood music than jazz. Smooth and nice. Gold album".

Track listing

Personnel 
 Grover Washington, Jr. – saxophones
 Richard Tee – Fender Rhodes
 Paul Griffin – synthesizers
 Eric Gale – guitars
 Marcus Miller – bass
 Steve Gadd – drums
 Ralph MacDonald – congas, percussion
 Grady Tate – lead vocals (3, 6)
 William Eaton – arrangements and conductor, backing vocals (3, 4, 5)
 Vivian Cherry – backing vocals (3, 4, 5)
 Frank Floyd – backing vocals (3, 4, 5)
 Yvonne Lewis – backing vocals (3, 4, 5)
 Ullanda McCullough – backing vocals (3, 4, 5)
 Zack Sanders – backing vocals (3, 4, 5)

Production 
 Grover Washington, Jr. – producer, mixing 
 Ralph MacDonald – producer, mixing 
 Richard Alderson – engineer, mixing 
 Kendall Brown – assistant engineer 
 Eddie Heath – assistant engineer 
 Lamont Moreno – assistant engineer
 Anthony MacDonald – assistant engineer
 Paul Silverthorn – production coordinator
 Ron Coro – art direction
 Norm Ung – art direction
 Denise Minobe – design 
 Jim Shea – photography

Charts

References

1981 albums
Elektra Records albums
Grover Washington Jr. albums